United States Public Law 103-150, informally known as the Apology Resolution, is a Joint Resolution of the U.S. Congress adopted in 1993 that "acknowledges that the overthrow of the Kingdom of Hawaii occurred with the active participation of agents and citizens of the United States and further acknowledges that the Native Hawaiian people never directly relinquished to the United States their claims to their inherent sovereignty as a people over their national lands, either through the Kingdom of Hawaii or through a plebiscite or referendum" (U.S. Public Law 103-150 (107 Stat. 1510)).  The resolution has been cited as impetus for the Hawaiian sovereignty movement, and has been the subject of debate. 

The resolution was adopted by both houses of the United States Congress on November 23, 1993. A joint resolution, it was signed by President of the United States Bill Clinton on the same day.

The resolution was passed in the Senate by a vote of 65–34. In the House, it was passed by a two-thirds voice vote. It was sponsored on January 21, 1993, as S.J.Res.19 by Daniel Akaka and co-sponsored by Daniel Inouye, both Democratic senators from Hawaii.

Arguments for

Historical evidence
The Apology Resolution derives mainly from the Blount Report, which was compiled shortly after the overthrow of the Hawaiian monarchy (spring 1893). Blount found strongly in the favor of Queen Liliʻuokalani and her supporters, and his report was an official criticism of the U.S. role in the overthrow. President Grover Cleveland was also strongly supportive of the Queen, and made official statements supporting the view held in the Blount Report. These official statements by the U.S. Government are seen as historical evidence for the claims made by the Apology Resolution.

Parallels between Native Hawaiians and Native Americans
Although the histories of Native Hawaiians and Native Americans are significantly different, there is still a widely held perception that Native Hawaiians have received similar kinds of unfair treatment from the U.S. Government as Native Americans. The Apology Bill is thus seen as a means of acknowledging historical grievances that they believe are valid. Some also see it as a step towards identifying Native Hawaiians as an indigenous people to preserve for them specific legal rights based on ancestry; some also see it as the beginning of a process to provide compensation or reparation to native Hawaiians for alleged past injustices.

How this decision on the "nonsubstantive" nature of the Apology Resolution will affect the pursuit of the Akaka Bill, which has based itself on the Apology Resolution, is not yet clear.

In 2009, the U.S. Congress passed a similar resolution, S.J.Res. 14, "To acknowledge a long history of official depredations and ill-conceived policies by the Federal Government regarding Indian tribes and offer an apology to all Native Peoples on behalf of the United States."

Arguments against

Disputed historical basis
Although the Blount Report of July 17, 1893, upon which the Apology Resolution was based, was an official report of the U.S. government, it was followed by the Morgan Report on February 26, 1894, which after public hearings and testimony under oath found the Blount Report to be mistaken on many of the facts reported. Some of the criticisms of the Blount Report included the fact that it was done in secrecy, with no opportunity for cross-examination of witnesses and no witnesses placed under oath. Opponents of the Apology Resolution point to this official repudiation of the Blount Report as sufficient reason to dismiss any conclusions based on it. Despite being staunchly in favor of reinstating the monarchy, President Grover Cleveland also reversed himself upon receipt of the Morgan Report, refusing requests from the queen for further aid in her restoration, and acknowledging both the Provisional Government and Republic of Hawaii as the legitimate successors to the Kingdom.

Washington-based constitutional lawyer and Grassroot Institute of Hawaii consultant Bruce Fein has outlined a number of counterarguments challenging the historical accuracy and completeness of the assertions made in the Apology Resolution.

Allegations that the bill was rushed through
There has been criticism of the 1993 Apology Bill for its use in buttressing the Akaka Bill. The Apology Bill of '93 was passed with only one hour of debate on the Senate floor with only five senators participating, three opposed (Slade Gorton, Hank Brown, John C. Danforth) and two in favor (Akaka and Inouye). It passed the house on November 15 in less time with no debate and no objections. Senator Inouye, wrapping up the debate, said:

The reliance upon the text of the Apology Resolution as justification for the Akaka Bill has been seen by some as contradicting Inouye's statements on the matter in 1993.

In 1993, Senators Slade Gorton and Hank Brown did not take issue with the historical accuracy of the bill, although they voted against it. More recently they have described it as being a piece of historical revisionism. They wrote an article in the Wall Street Journal titled The Opposite Of Progress in which they were critical of the historical veracity of the Apology Bill.

Practical legal effect

In a response to the State of Hawai'i Appeal of the Arakaki Decision, the plaintiffs argued that the "whereas" clauses should not be given legal effect.

In testimony before the United States Senate Committee on the Judiciary, April 17, 2002, Professor of Law Mr. Michael Glennon makes clear the fact that whereas clauses in general can have "no binding legal effect":

The legal effect of the Apology Resolution was addressed in the decision of the U.S. Supreme Court of March 31, 2009, which held that the 37 "whereas" clauses of the Apology Resolution have no binding legal effect, nor does it convey any rights or make any legal findings for native Hawaiian claims. The Court concluded that the Resolution does not change or modify the "absolute" title to the public lands of the State of Hawai'i.  The decision also affirmed that federal legislation cannot retroactively alter a title given as a part of statehood in general.

References

External links
morganreport.org Online images and transcriptions of the entire Morgan Report
 
   attacks Stevens
 

1993 in American law
History of Hawaii
Overthrow of the Hawaiian Kingdom
United States congressional resolutions passed both by House and Senate
Native Hawaiian
Indigenous land rights in Hawaii
1993 in Hawaii
Legal history of Hawaii